Gerrit "Gert" Bals (18 October 1936 – 20 May 2016) was a Dutch footballer who played as a goalkeeper.

Bals became the first Dutch goalkeeper in an UEFA Cup final, when he played for Ajax in the 1969 European Cup Final against Milan.

Club career
Born in Utrecht, Bals played for local side RUC and Velox before joining SV Zeist when they entered at the start of the professional era in Holland. After a spell at 't Gooi, he moved to PSV for whom he would play 120 matches winning the 1963 league title and later Ajax.

He played 216 official matches for Ajax after making his debut for them in August 1965 and won 4 league titles with the club. He won the Dutch Footballer of the Year Award in 1969.

He finished his career at Vitesse after losing Ajax´ number one jersey to Heinz Stuy in 1970.

Personal life
After retiring as a player, Bals owned a sportshop in Velp and later a tobacco shop in Veendaal. He died in May 2016.

References

1936 births
2016 deaths
Footballers from Utrecht (city)
Association football goalkeepers
Dutch footballers
Velox SC players
PSV Eindhoven players
AFC Ajax players
SBV Vitesse players
Eredivisie players
SC 't Gooi players
Dutch football managers
Kozakken Boys managers